The 2015–16 season was Koper's 22nd season in the Slovenian PrvaLiga, Slovenian top division, since the league was created. Koper competed in the PrvaLiga, Cup and Europa League. The season for the club began on 2 July 2015 and ended on 21 May 2016.

Players
As of 1 March 2016

Source:FC Koper

Competitions

Overall

Overview

Supercup

PrvaLiga

League table

Results summary

Results by round

Matches

Cup

Round of 16

Quarter-finals

UEFA Europa League

First qualifying round

Second qualifying round

Statistics

Squad statistics

Goalscorers

See also
2015–16 Slovenian PrvaLiga
2015–16 Slovenian Football Cup
2015 Slovenian Supercup
2015–16 UEFA Europa League

References

External links
Official FC Koper website 
Twitter profile
Facebook profile
PrvaLiga profile 
Soccerway profile

Slovenian football clubs 2015–16 season